The New South Wales Police Gazette and Weekly Record of Crime was initially published on 2 January 1854 as the New South Wales Reports of Crime and was initially published several times per week by the Office of the Inspector General of Police for distribution to all police stations. The NSW State Archives and Records describe it as containing
"details of crimes committed, persons to be apprehended, descriptions of stolen property and rewards offered, lists of regimental and ships deserters, and other police notices concerning recovery of property, apprehension of suspects previously sought, and dismissals of police officers for unsatisfactory conduct".

From 5 March 1862 the title was changed to the New South Wales Police Gazette and Weekly Record of Crime, was published weekly and was said to contain the substance of information received in cases of felony and misdemeanors with description of offenders, &c. and every particular which may lead to their apprehension".

The gazette continued to be published until 14 July 1982, however records after 1930 are not publicly available.

Digitisation
The gazette has been digitised and made available on Trove from 4 June 1862, to 31 December 1930.

References

Newspapers published in New South Wales
Publications established in 1854
Weekly newspapers published in Australia
Police gazettes
Law enforcement in New South Wales
Government gazettes of Australia
Newspapers on Trove
1854 establishments in Australia